"Gotas de Agua Dulce" (Eng.: Drops of Fresh Water) is the title of the second single released by Juanes from his fourth studio album La Vida... Es Un Ratico.

Chart performance
The track debuted in the United States Billboard Hot Latin Tracks chart at number 33 on 19 January 2008, and in the week of 23 February 2008, the single peaked at number 1, dethroning his own single "Me Enamora" which spent 20 non-consecutive weeks at the summit.

In Mexico, a preloaded bundle of audio and video tracks including "Me Enamora", "La Vida Es Un Ratico", "Gotas de Agua Dulce" and "Webisode" was certified 2×Platinum+Gold by Asociación Mexicana de Productores de Fonogramas y Videogramas (AMPROFON) for selling 250,000 unites.

Charts and certifications

Weekly charts

Year-end charts

Certifications

See also
List of number-one songs of 2008 (Mexico)

References

2008 singles
Juanes songs
Monitor Latino Top General number-one singles
Record Report Top 100 number-one singles
Songs written by Juanes
Song recordings produced by Gustavo Santaolalla
Spanish-language songs
Universal Music Latino singles
2007 songs